Steffen Freund (born 19 January 1970) is a German former professional footballer who played as a defensive midfielder in both the German and English top flights. He was capped 21 times for his country and played a significant part in Germany's UEFA Euro 1996 winning campaign. He is currently working for Tottenham Hotspur.

Club career
Freund started his career at Stahl Brandenburg, coming through their youth system. He has said that the Stasi made an unsuccessful attempt to recruit him as an informer during his time at the club. In 1991, he was transferred to FC Schalke 04 and he established himself as an important midfield player. Schalke were forced to sell Freund due to financial reasons in 1993 to Borussia Dortmund where he stayed until 1998. During his time at Dortmund, he won the league twice in 1995 and 1996 and gained a Champions League medal in 1997, but was left out of the squad for the final altogether.

In December 1998, Freund transferred to English Premiership club Tottenham Hotspur. During his time with the London club, he won the League Cup in 1999, starting in the center of midfield in Spurs's 1–0 win over Leicester City. He stayed at the club until 2003, and despite never scoring a goal in 131 appearances across all competitions, he became a firm fans favourite at the club for his heart, work ethic and commitment. On 4 December 2009, Freund was inducted into the Tottenham Hotspur hall of fame alongside Darren Anderton.

At the tail end of his career he went on to have short spells at 1. FC Kaiserslautern and Leicester City.

International career
Between 1995 and 1998, he won 21 caps for the German national team. He won UEFA Euro 1996 with Germany, where he missed out on a place in the final because of an injury in their semi-final win over England. He also appeared at the 1998 FIFA World Cup, where Germany fell at the quarter-final stage to Croatia; Freund was an unused substitute in the match.

Coaching career
On 1 September 2007, Freund was appointed assistant head-coach of the German U-20 team.

On 5 December 2007, he was named as a new assistant to Nigeria coach Berti Vogts for the time of the African Nations Cup. He then resumed his work as assistant to German U20-manager Frank Engel. In May 2009 he finished his coaching badges and on 17 July 2009 he was appointed manager of the German U-16 team signing a two-year contract. A year later he began managing the German U-17 team leading them to a runners up medal at the 2011 UEFA European U-17 Football Championship and a third place at the World Cup in Mexico. He then started working with the new generation of U-16 players. On 11 July 2012, Freund was appointed assistant head coach of Tottenham Hotspur. On 5 August 2014 he was appointed International Technical Coordinator. On 21 April 2017, while on Sky Sports, Freund stated that he was not interested in getting back into coaching. He instead was enjoying the freedom from pressure which he was experiencing as a pundit.

Television career
In 2006, he appeared alongside Boris Becker in a special England v. Germany edition of the popular panel show They Think It's All Over. At the start of the 2011–12 season, Freund began working as a pundit for Eurosport's coverage of the German Bundesliga and Sky Deutschland. He is also a co-commentator for the English world feed of the Bundesliga.

Personal life
Freund is married and has one son and two daughters. His son, Niklas, plays as a goalkeeper for SV Empor Berlin FC, having previously played for VCD Athletic and Redbridge.

Honours
Borussia Dortmund
Bundesliga: 1994–95, 1995–96
DFB-Supercup: 1995
UEFA Champions League: 1996–97
Intercontinental Cup: 1997

Tottenham Hotspur
Football League Cup: 1998–99

Germany
European Championship: 1996

Individual
Tottenham Hotspur Hall of Fame: December 2009 Inductee

References

External links
 
 
 
 Steffen Freund at tottenhamhotspur.com

Living people
1970 births
Sportspeople from Brandenburg an der Havel
Association football midfielders
Premier League players
Expatriate footballers in England
German footballers
East German footballers
Germany international footballers
FC Schalke 04 players
Borussia Dortmund players
Tottenham Hotspur F.C. players
Leicester City F.C. players
1. FC Kaiserslautern players
German expatriate footballers
UEFA Euro 1996 players
1998 FIFA World Cup players
UEFA European Championship-winning players
Bundesliga players
German expatriate sportspeople in England
Footballers from Brandenburg
People from Bezirk Potsdam